Joseph L. Abbrescia (October 1, 1936 - February 17, 2005) was an American painter of the American West. By 2002, he had become "one of the country's most accomplished plein-air artists."

Early life
Abbrescia was born on October 1, 1936, in New York City. He attended the American Academy of Art in Chicago.

Career
With his brother, Abbrescia was the co-director of an art school in Skokie, Illinois, from the 1950s to the 1970s, when he moved to Kalispell, Montana, to focus on his own paintings. Abbrescia painted the American West. By 2002, he had become "one of the country's most accomplished plein-air artists."

Abbrescia won the Best of Show distinction at the C. M. Russell Auction of Original Western Art three times: once in 2002, and twice in 2004. He also won the Honorary Chairman's Award from the C. M. Russell Museum in Great Falls, Montana, in 2005.

Personal life and death
With his wife Sue, Abbrescia had two sons.

Abbrescia died of cancer on February 17, 2005, in Kalispell, Montana, at age 68.

References

External links
Official website

1936 births
2005 deaths
Artists from New York City
People from Skokie, Illinois
People from Kalispell, Montana
Artists from Montana
American male painters
Artists of the American West
Deaths from cancer in Montana